Geoffrey Batchen (born 21 November 1956, Melbourne, Australia) is an Australian art historian. Since 2020, Batchen has been Professor of Art History at the University of Oxford.

Career

Professor 
Assistant Professor, Visual Arts, University of California, San Diego, 1991–1996; Associate Professor, Art and Art History, University of New Mexico, Albuquerque, 1996–2001; Professor of Art History: City University of New York Graduate Center, New York City, 2002–2010; Victoria University of Wellington, New Zealand, 2010–2019.
Much of Batchen's work as a professor and curator focuses on the history of photography.

Curator 
His curated exhibitions have been shown at the Museu Nacional de Belas Artes in Rio de Janeiro; the New England Regional Art Museum in Amridale, Australia; the Van Gogh Museum in Amsterdam; the National Media Museum in Bradford, England; the International Center of Photography in New York; the Wallraf-Richartz-Museum in Cologne, Germany; the Izu Photo Museum in Shizuoka, Japan; the National Museum of Iceland in Reykjavik; the Adam Art Gallery in Wellington, New Zealand; the Govett-Brewster Art Gallery in New Plymouth, NZ; and the Centre for Contemporary Photography in Melbourne, Australia.

Bibliography 
 Burning with Desire: The Conception of Photography (MIT Press, 1997) 
 Each Wild Idea: Writing, Photography, History (MIT Press, 2001) 
 Forget Me Not: Photography and Remembrance (Princeton Architectural Press, 2004)
 William Henry Fox Talbot (Phaidon Press, France, 2008)
 What of Shoes: Van Gogh and Art History (E. A. Seemann, 2009)
 Photography Degree Zero: Reflections on Roland Barthes's Camera Lucida (MIT Press, 2009)
 Suspending Time: Life, Photography, Death (2010)
 Emanations: The Art of the Cameraless Photograph (Prestel Publishing, 2016)
 Apparitions: Photography and Dissemination (Power Publications, 2018)
 Negative/Positive: A History of Photography (Routledge, 2020)

References 

1956 births
Living people
British art historians
Academics of the University of Oxford